Washington/Wabash is an 'L' station on the CTA's Brown, Green, Orange, Pink, and Purple Lines. The station opened on August 31, 2017. It serves as a consolidation and replacement of the Randolph/Wabash and Madison/Wabash stations. The project was undertaken by the Chicago Department of Transportation. Construction of the $75 million station began in 2015 following the closure of Madison/Wabash in March 2015 and was completed in August 2017. The station is located between Washington and Madison Streets on Wabash Avenue in the Loop.

In 2018, the new station was recognized with an award of excellence by the American Institute of Architects, Chicago chapter.

Bus connections
CTA
J14 Jeffrey Jump
20 Madison (Owl Service)
56 Milwaukee
60 Blue Island/26th (Owl Service) 
124 Navy Pier
147 Outer DuSable Lake Shore Express
151 Sheridan
157 Streeterville/Taylor (Weekdays only)

Station layout

References

External links

 Official website
 Washington/Wabash at Chicago-L.org

Railway stations in the United States opened in 2017
2017 establishments in Illinois
CTA Green Line stations
CTA Brown Line stations
CTA Orange Line stations
CTA Pink Line stations
CTA Purple Line stations